Dancesport competitions at the 2021 Southeast Asian Games took place at Long Biên District Sporting Hall in Hanoi, Vietnam from 15 to 16 May 2022.

Medal table

Medalists

Standard

Latin American

References

Dancesport
2021